LY1 (Y&Y 256 glyph encoding) is an 8-bit TeX encoding developed by Berthold Horn.

Character set

References 

Character sets